Martini Sparks is a Dutch women's basketball club based in Haren. Since its establishment in 2018, it plays in the Vrouwen Basketball League (VBL), the highest tier in the Netherlands.

History
The club was established in 2018 to become the first team from the province Groningen to play in the Vrouwen Basketball League since 2011. On 22 January 2019, the Sparks won their first game ever as they beat Lekdetec Bemmel 55–47 at home.

Sponsorship names
Due to sponsorship reasons, the team has been known as:
2018–present: Keijser Capital Martini Sparks

Season by season

Head coaches
 Glenn Pinas (2018–2019)
 Klaas Stoppels (2019–)

References

External links
Official website

Women's basketball teams in the Netherlands
Basketball teams established in 2018
Sports clubs in Groningen (city)
2018 establishments in the Netherlands